Elizabeth Marshall Thomas (born September 13, 1931) is an American author. She has published fiction and non-fiction books and articles on animal behavior, Paleolithic life, and the !Kung Bushmen of the Kalahari Desert.

Early life and education
Thomas was born to anthropologist Lorna Marshall and Laurence K. Marshall, co-founder of the Raytheon Corporation. She is the sister of ethnographic filmmaker John Marshall. She was raised in Cambridge, Massachusetts and attended Abbot Academy in Andover, Massachusetts.

After beginning undergraduate studies at Smith College, Thomas took a break to travel in Africa with her family and later completed a degree in English from Radcliffe College.

Career
Between 1950 and 1956, she took part in three expeditions to live with and study the Ju/'hoansi (!Kung Bushmen) of the Kalahari Desert in Namibia and Botswana. During these trips, Thomas kept a journal which she later drew on when writing her first book, The Harmless People. She later drew on this experience in her fiction, depicting the life of paleolithic hunter gatherers in the novels Reindeer Moon and The Animal Wife.

A popular success and New York Times bestseller, her book The Hidden Life of Dogs also drew criticism from some in the scientific and dog training communities for Thomas' observational methods and analysis. Thomas wrote a follow-up book, The Social Life of Dogs: The Grace of Canine Company, as well as books on feline and deer behavior. She also contributes, along with Sy Montgomery, to a column called "Tamed/Untamed" in the Boston Globe.

Personal life
Ms. Thomas has long made her home in Peterborough, New Hampshire. With proceeds from her bestselling book about dogs, she donated land for Peterborough's first town beach at Cunningham Pond, where canines of town residents are always welcome. She served on the town's Select Board for 15 years.

Bibliography

Non-fiction
Anthropology
 
Warrior Herdsmen (1965), Secker & Warburg, ASIN B0000CMXZI
 
The Old Way: A Story of the First People (2006) Farrar, Straus and Giroux, 
Ethology and animal culture
The Hidden Life of Life (2018), Penn State University Press, 
The Hidden Life of Dogs (1993), Houghton Mifflin, 
The Tribe of Tiger: Cats and Their Culture (1994), Simon & Schuster, 
The Social Lives of Dogs: The Grace of Canine Company (2000), Simon & Schuster, 
The Hidden Life of Deer: Lessons from the Natural World (2009), Harper, 
A Million Years with You: A Memoir of Life Observed (2013), Houghton Mifflin Harcourt,

Novels
Reindeer Moon (1987), Houghton Mifflin, 
The Animal Wife (1990), Houghton Mifflin, 
Certain Poor Shepherds: A Christmas Tale (1996), Simon & Schuster,

Critical studies and reviews of Thomas' work
  <ref>Review of The tribe of tiger.

References

External links 
 http://elizabethmarshallthomas.net Official Elizabeth Marshall Thomas Website
 Elizabeth Marshall Thomas on Literati.net
 Interview with Elizabeth Marshall Thomas on Mother Nature Network
 Salon.com people | Elizabeth Marshall Thomas
 Socializing Humans
 The tribe of tiger : cats and their culture
 The social lives of dogs : the grace of canine company

1931 births
Living people
20th-century American novelists
20th-century American women writers
American anthropologists
American women novelists
American women anthropologists
Animal cognition writers
Radcliffe College alumni
Smith College alumni
People from Peterborough, New Hampshire
American women non-fiction writers
20th-century American non-fiction writers
Abbot Academy alumni
21st-century American women